Syncarpha speciosissima, the Cape everlasting or Cape sewejaartjie, is a species of plant from South Africa.

Description 
It is covered in white wooly hairs and produces new shoots every year. The light grey-green leaves are held close to the base of the stem and are oblong or linear in shape.

Disc-shaped flower heads are borne on the ends of long stems between July and January. The center starts off yellow, turning brown with age. The flower is surrounded by sharply pointed petal-like bracts. They have a papery texture and are white or cream in colour.

Distribution and habitat 
This species in endemic to the Western Cape of South Africa, where it grows on sandstone slopes between the Cape Peninsula and Tradouw Pass. It prefers the upper slopes of mountains and grows in open areas between bushes.

References 

Flora of South Africa
Plants described in 1989
Gnaphalieae